Kristina Roegner (born November 27, 1968) is a member of the Ohio Senate, serving the 27th District since 2019.  Her district encompasses suburban Akron, parts of Summit County, all of Wayne County, and parts of Stark County.

Career
Roegner graduated cum laude from Tufts University in 1990 with a degree in Mechanical Engineering.  Soon after, she worked for Westinghouse Power Generation overhauling power turbines, from 1990 to 1993.

She then moved on to consulting. Roegner entered public office in 2004, when she was seated on the Hudson City Council.

Ohio Senate
Senator Kristina Roegner is serving her first term in the Ohio Senate representing the 27th Senate District which includes Ohioans living in Wayne County and parts of Summit and Stark counties.

The 27th Senate District was redistricted to exist solely in Summit County for the 2022 election cycle. Senator Roegner is running for reelection.

Ohio House of Representatives
When Mike Moran won the 42nd District in 2008, he took a seat in what was traditionally a Republican district.  Therefore, he was a top target for House Republicans in 2010, and Roegner was fielded to try to unseat him.  In the end, she went on to beat Moran 51% to 49%.

For the 129th General Assembly, Speaker of the House William G. Batchelder named Roegner as a member of the Republican majority caucus' Policy Committee. She was sworn into office on January 3, 2011.

Roegner won reelection to the seat in 2012 with 54.18% of the vote over Democrat Tom Schmida, and again in 2014 with 58% of the vote.  She is known for being one of the most conservative members of the House, despite her competitive district.

Committee assignments
Committee on Public Utilities (Vice Chair)
Committee on Commerce and Labor

Initiatives and positions
While in a traditionally swing district, Roegner supported a controversial bill that looked to limit collective bargaining for public employees, stating that it is something taxpayers should celebrate.

Roegner has also been an advocate for selling state lands for oil and natural gas drilling, including on Lake Erie.  She had urged rejection of the amendment, which would have added an extra layer of protection for Lake Erie on top of an existing federal ban on drilling, stating that it is foolish to let only Canada reap the benefits of the reserves underneath the lake.

She has been critical of Governor John Kasich and his education funding formulas, calling them "wealth redistribution".

In May 2020, during the COVID-19 pandemic, Roegner and Senator Rob McColley introduced a bill that would immediately end Ohio's stay-at-home order and limit the state health director's ability to give similar orders. The bill is contrary to the recommendation of the country's top medical experts; Governor DeWine has promised to veto any bill that curb's the health director's authority during the crisis.

Elected history

References

External links
Kristina for Ohio official campaign site

1968 births
Living people
Tufts University School of Engineering alumni
Republican Party members of the Ohio House of Representatives
Women state legislators in Ohio
People from Hudson, Ohio
21st-century American politicians
21st-century American women politicians
Politicians from Akron, Ohio
Republican Party Ohio state senators